The Grafton Correctional Institution is a state prison for men located in Grafton, Lorain County, Ohio, owned and operated by the Ohio Department of Rehabilitation and Correction.  

The facility was opened in 1988 and houses a maximum of 2,074 inmates at a mix of minimum and medium security levels.

References

Prisons in Ohio
Buildings and structures in Lorain County, Ohio
1988 establishments in Ohio